Nouria Newman (born 9 September 1991 in Chambéry is a French slalom canoeist who competed at the international level from 2007 to 2015.

She won two medals at the ICF Canoe Slalom World Championships with a gold in 2014 (K1 team) and a silver in 2013 (K1). She also won a bronze medal in the K1 team event at the 2014 European Championships in Vienna.

She made a solo kayaking expedition Ladakh 2018 sponsored by Red Bull. She paddled down the Tsarap - Zanskar - Indus River in 7 days, covering 375 km; and was, in her own words, after getting hung up on a rock at one point, lucky to be alive.  She made a 13 minute video of this journey which is on YouTube. She was the first female to paddle a 100 foot waterfall (Pucono Falls, Ecuador)

Nouria's life and accomplishments were the focus of the 2022 Red Bull film, Wild Waters.

References

1991 births
French female canoeists
Living people
Medalists at the ICF Canoe Slalom World Championships